The Caballococha Airport  is a small regional airport serving Caballococha, in the eastern Loreto Region of Peru near the Tres Fronteras, which is a tri-border between Peru, Brazil, and Colombia. It receives charter flights from all over Peru as well as to Colombia and Brazil.

Airlines and Destinations

See also

Transport in Peru
List of airports in Peru

References

External links
OpenStreetMap - Caballococha
OurAirports - Caballococha

Airports in Peru
Buildings and structures in Loreto Region
Tres Fronteras